Mokuʻula is a tiny island now buried beneath a present-day baseball field in Maluʻulu o Lele Park, Lahaina, Hawaiʻi. It was the private residence of King Kamehameha III from 1837 to 1845 and the burial site of several Hawaiian royals. The  island was and continues to be considered sacred to many Hawaiians as a piko, or symbolic center of energy and power.  

According to author P. Christiaan Klieger, "the moated palace of Mokuʻula...was a place of the "Sacred Red Mists," an oasis of rest and calm during the raucous, rollicking days of Pacific whaling." When the capital of Hawaiʻi moved from Lahaina to Honolulu, Mokuʻula fell into disrepair. By 1919, the county turned the land into a park. A non-profit group was later established to restore the site.

It was added to the Hawaiʻi State Register of Historic Places on August 29, 1994, and to the National Register of Historic Places on May 9, 1997, as King Kamehameha III's Royal Residential Complex.

Loko o Mokuhinia 
Mokuʻula was surrounded by Mokuhinia, a  spring-fed, wetland pond. The pond was reported to be the home of Kihawahine, a powerful moʻo or lizard goddess. According to myth, the moʻo was a reincarnation of Piʻilani's daughter, the chiefess, Kalaʻaiheana. Hawaiians cultivated loʻi, or taro patches, and fishponds within Mokuhinia.

Restoration 

The Friends of Mokuʻula, a non-profit organization dedicated to restoration of the sacred site, formed in 1990 but is no longer active. From 1992 to 1995 and in 1999, archaeologists from Bishop Museum and Heritage Surveys surveyed the site and documented its features and boundaries.

References

Further reading and resources

External links 

Friends of Mokuʻula Official Site
Lahaina's Invisible Island Maui No Ka 'Oi Magazine Jan/Feb 2009.

Geography of Maui
Archaeological sites in Hawaii
History of Maui
Former islands of the United States
Cemeteries in Hawaii
Royal residences in Hawaii
Lahaina, Hawaii
Houses on the National Register of Historic Places in Hawaii